The Stadium Metro Station is located on the Blue Line of the Hyderabad Metro.  It is near to Rajiv Gandhi International Cricket Stadium, Hyderabad.

History 
It was opened on 29 November 2017.

Facilities 
A dedicated skyway has been planned to connect the metro station to the cricket stadium. The skywalk will also connect a Special Economic Zone that houses Nuzivid Seeds Limited.

References

Hyderabad Metro stations